The People's Public Security of Vietnam is the main police and security forces of Vietnam, under control of the Ministry of Public Security. It is a part of the Vietnam People's Armed Forces and under the de facto control of Communist Party of Vietnam.

The PPS' powers are regulated under No. 73/2014/QH13, which was passed on November 27, 2014.

Functions and branches
The People's Public Security of Vietnam has two branches:
Vietnam People's Security
 Prevent, investigate, and defeat potential actions against enemies of the Vietnamese nation and that can endanger national security.
 Espionage.
 Joining forces in internal political security, economical security, ideology-cultural security, network security and information security with other uniformed bodies as established by law.
 Manage entrance or exit visas, border security crossing and checkpoints, and immigration stations in airposts, as well as in securing foreigners and Vietnamese expats in their visits to the country.
 Defending the secrecy of the Government of the Republic against external and internal threats
 Helping to build personal security in every aspect of life, at every area in the country.
 Performing other duties, missions and responsibilities in keeping with the law.
Vietnam People's Police (including Civil Defence forces)
 Working to prevent, investigate and solve environmental, political, traffic, functional and corruption-related criminal activities in keeping with the laws of the Socialist Republic
 Working with the general public on crime prevention and in participation in its actions
 Perform responsibilities and duties pertaining to:
 Identification security
 Public security
 Transport security
 Road and highway safety
 Firefighting
 Civil defence
 Disaster preparedness and response
 Execute other duties and missions in accordance with the Constitution and the laws of the Socialist Republic of Vietnam.

These two forces are trained mainly at two institutions, the People's Police Academy of Vietnam and the People's Security Academy of Vietnam.

Tasks and powers of the People's Public Security Forces

To collect information, analyze, evaluate and predict situation and propose the Party and the State to promulgate and direct the implementation of guidelines, policies, laws and strategies on protection of national security and maintenance of social order and safety. To propose the combination of requirements of the strategies on protection of national security and maintenance of social order and safety with those strategies and policies on socio-economic construction and development, national defense and the State's external relations.
To protect the freedom rights, democracy, life and property of the people; to protect high-ranking leading officials of the Party and the State and foreign guests; to safeguard important events, targets and key projects of national security, foreign representative offices, representatives of Vietnam-based international organizations, individuals holding or closely related to state secrets.
To receive and process reports and denouncements on crimes, initiate criminal lawsuits and investigate crimes, and perform other judicial tasks according to the provisions of law.
To sanction administrative violations and apply other administrative handling measures as provided for by law.
To guide, inspect and examine agencies, organizations and citizens in performing the task of protecting national security and maintaining social order and safety; to conduct the law propagation, dissemination and education and build up "the whole population protects the Fatherland's security" movement.
To apply masses mobilization, legal, diplomatic, economic, scientific-technical, professional and armed measures to protect national security and maintain social order and safety.
To use weapons, supporting tools and necessary technical and professional means in attacking crimes and making self-defense according to the provisions of law.
In case of necessity, to issue decisions on or propose the suspension or termination of operations of agencies, organizations or individuals which are detrimental to national security, social order and safety; to requisition means of transport, communication equipments and other technical means of agencies, organizations, individuals and operators or users of such means according to the provisions of law.
To request agencies, organizations or individuals to coordinate in activities and supply information related to national security, social order and safety.
To closely coordinate with the People's Army, Self-Defense and Militia Forces and state agencies in protecting national security, maintaining social order and safety, and defending the national independence, sovereignty, unity and territorial integrity.
To research and apply modern scientific and technological achievements in protecting national security and maintaining social order and safety.
To build up the forces of political, ideological, organizational and professional cleanliness and strength.
To enter into international cooperation on protection of national security and social order and safety.

The organisational system of the People's Public Security Forces

The organisational system of the People's Public Security Forces is composed of:
 Ministry of Public Security;
 Public Security Departments of municipalities and provinces
 Public Security Offices of rural districts, urban districts, towns and provincial cities;
 Public Security Posts of communes, wards and townships.

Department of Public Security of municipalities
 Hanoi Public Security Department
 Ho Chi Minh City Public Security Department
 Hai Phong Public Security Department
 Da Nang Public Security Department
 Can Tho Public Security Department

Ranks of the People's Public Security of Vietnam

Officers

NCOs and enlisted

Notes

References

External links
  

Military of Vietnam
Law enforcement in Vietnam
Law enforcement agencies in Asia